Zubří may refer to:
 Zubří, a village in the Zlín Region of the Czech Republic
 Zubří, a village in the Žďár nad Sázavou District of the Czech Republic